Wyoming Highway 157 (WYO 157) is a  Wyoming State Road located in central Goshen County west of Lingle.

Route description
Wyoming Highway 157 is an L-shaped route  in length, and is located west of the town of Lingle. WYO 157 travels from US Route 26 southeast of Fort Laramie south across the North Platte River before turning east and heading toward Lingle. WYO 157 serves the southern side of the river between its two ends. Highway 157 ends at Wyoming Highway 156 just south of the WYO 156/US 26/US 85 junction in Lingle.

Mileposts along Highway 157 increase from east to west.

History

Major intersections

References

Official 2003 State Highway Map of Wyoming

External links 

Wyoming State Routes 100-199
WYO 157 - WYO 156 to US 26

Transportation in Goshen County, Wyoming
157